Hunter Noah Brown (born August 29, 1998) is an American professional baseball pitcher for the Houston Astros of Major League Baseball (MLB). He played college baseball at Wayne State University. The Astros selected him in the fifth round of the 2019 MLB draft, and he made his MLB debut in 2022.

Early life
Born in Detroit, Michigan, Brown grew up in St. Clair Shores, Michigan.  He attended Lakeview High School, where he played catcher and pitcher.

While Justin Verlander was pitching the for the Detroit Tigers, Brown grew up idolizing him and would frequently attend games at Comerica Park.  Late in the 2022 season, Verlander landed on the injured list due to a right calf issue, and the Houston Astros called Brown up to the major leagues.  The two pitchers became teammates.

Brown played college baseball at NCAA Division II Wayne State University, located one mile from Comerica Park, and the only school at any level to offer him a scholarship.  In 2018, he played in two collegiate summer baseball leagues. First, he played for the Bethesda Big Train of the Cal Ripken Collegiate Baseball League where he appeared in 13 games and pitched to an ERA of 1.26. After his season with the Big Train, Brown  played with the Cotuit Kettleers of the Cape Cod Baseball League.  As a junior at Wayne State, Brown went 9–0 with a 2.21 earned run average over 14 starts and struck out 114 batters in  innings pitched.

Professional career

Draft and minor leagues
Brown was selected in the 5th round of the 2019 Major League Baseball (MLB) draft by the Houston Astros. He signed with the team and was assigned to the Tri-City ValleyCats of the Class A Short Season New York–Penn League and went 2–2 with a 4.56 ERA and 33 strikeouts in 23.2 innings pitched.

After not playing in 2020 due to the cancellation of the minor league season caused by the COVID-19 pandemic, Brown began the 2021 season with the Double-A Corpus Christi Hooks. Brown was promoted to the Triple-A Sugar Land Skeeters in August 2021 after posting a 1–4 record with a 4.20 ERA and 76 strikeouts in  innings pitched with the Hooks.

The Astros invited Brown to 2022 Spring Training camp as a non-roster invitee.  He returned to Sugar Land to start the season, and was selected to the All-Star Futures Game.  On May 31, he was named Pacific Coast League (PCL) Pitcher of the Week after a scoreless 7-inning outing with 10 strikeouts versus the El Paso Chihuahuas.  Brown finished his season in Triple A as the PCL leader in ERA (2.55, minimum 60 innings pitched), and induced a strikeout rate of 31.5% and groundball rate of 54.2%.  Over 23 total appearances, he made 14 starts and hurled 106 innings.  In August 2022, Brown ranked as the Astros' top prospect and moved in MLB.com Pipeline's from #80 to #71 overall in baseball.  His curveball (65) was graded as the best among all top-100 prospects.  Following the regular season, he was named PCL Pitcher of the Year, and the Houston Astros' Minor League Pitcher of the Year.

Houston Astros
The Astros promoted Brown from Sugar Land to the major league roster for the first time on September 1, 2022.  On September 5, he started and won a sensational major league debut, hurling the first six innings of a 1–0 shutout of the Texas Rangers.  He allowed three hits, one walk and struck out five to outduel Rangers ace Martín Pérez.  Brown retired the first eight batters faced, including striking out the first two of the game, Marcus Semien and Corey Seager, for his first two career strikeouts.  The win evened the Astros' all-time franchise win-loss record at 4,812–4,812, for the first time since in May 14, 2006.  In his second start of the season, Brown made his road debut as a homecoming in Detroit with friends and family in attendance, leading a 6–3 defeat of the Tigers.  He allowed two runs on five hits over six innings.  On September 19, Brown made his relief debut, hurling three innings in a 4–0 shutout of the Tampa Bay Rays to clinch a fifth American League West division title for the Astros over the previous six seasons.   On October 4, Brown relieved Verlander in an ongoing no-hitter versus the Philadelphia Phillies and delivered  hitless innings that Houston pitching maintained until the ninth inning. 

In 2022, Brown was 2–0 with an 0.89 ERA in  innings with 22 strikeouts, in seven games (two starts).

Brown made his postseason debut on October 11, 2022, in Game 1 of the American League Division Series.  He pitched in relief in the eighth inning, surrendering just one hit in an 8–7 Astros' walk-off win over the Seattle Mariners.  Brown also threw two scoreless innings in the 12th and 13th of the Astros' 18-inning victory over the Mariners in Game 3. Brown's last appearance of the postseason came in Game 3 of the American League Championship Series against the New York Yankees, throwing  of an inning to help close out a 5–0 win. The Astros advanced to the World Series and defeated the Phillies in six games to give him his first career World Series title.

See also
 List of Wayne State University people

References

External links

Wayne State Warriors bio

Living people
1998 births
Baseball players from Detroit
Bethesda Big Train players
Corpus Christi Hooks players
Cotuit Kettleers players
Houston Astros players
Major League Baseball pitchers
Sugar Land Skeeters players
Sugar Land Space Cowboys players
Tri-City ValleyCats players
Wayne State Warriors baseball players